Francisco Romero López (born 1 December  1933) is a Spanish bullfighter, known as Curro Romero. Born in Camas, near Seville. 

He started his professional career in La Pañoleta (Seville), on August 22, 1954 together with Limeño.

His first corrida with horses took place in Utrera (Sevilla), on September 8, 1954, fighting bulls that belonged to Ruperto de los Reyes and Francisco Corpas. His debut in Madrid happened on July 18, 1957, with bulls from Alipio Pérez-Tabernero. He was not very successful on that day.

His career was one of the longest in bullfighting. It was also very irregular. He retired at age 66, after 42 years in the profession. There is a bronze statue of him outside the bullring in Sevilla.

External links
Web de Curro Romero

1933 births
Living people
Spanish bullfighters
People from Camas, Seville
Sportspeople from the Province of Seville